A badge tether or badge reel is a spring-loaded reeled tether that resembles a button badge in appearance or attachment. It is used to avoid damage to or the loss of small important objects kept on-person that need to be accessed frequently or quickly, such as a ski pass, identification card or badge, name badge, keys, a phone or other handheld device, or a penknife or other small tool.

Badge tethers consist of a thin cord, dimensions on the order of a millimetre diameter by a metre long with one end wound round a spring-loaded reel contained within a small badge-like body that has a clip for a belt, belt loop, pocket, the edge of the clothing itself, or an attachment specifically for such a tether. The other end of the cord has a clip, loop, splitring, strap, or other fastener.

Hardware (mechanical)